The AVIC I Commercial Aircraft Company (ACAC consortium) was a subsidiary of China Aviation Industry Corporation I (AVIC I), formed in 2002 by various Chinese aviation companies, including:

 Shanghai Aircraft Design and Research Institute
 602nd Aircraft Design Institute
 Chengdu Aircraft Industry Group
 Shanghai Aircraft Manufacturing Factory
 Shenyang Aircraft Corporation
 Xi'an Aircraft Industrial Corporation

In 2009 it became part of Commercial Aircraft Corporation of China.

Products
 The joint venture has developed the ARJ21 regional jet.

References

External links

Aircraft manufacturers of China
Manufacturing companies established in 2002
Manufacturing companies disestablished in 2009
Defence companies of the People's Republic of China
Defunct government-owned companies of China
Chinese companies established in 2002
Chinese companies disestablished in 2009
2002 establishments in China
2009 disestablishments in China